Mohamed Abbatay (born ), known under his nom de guerre, Abd al-Rahman al-Maghribi, is a Moroccan member of al-Qaeda, he heads the organization's External Communications Office. He is the son in law of Ayman al-Zawahiri.

Early life and education 
Abbatay was born in Marrakesh, Morocco. He left Morocco for Germany in 1996, where he studied software programming and electrical engineering in Cologne and the Hochschule Niederrhein University of Applied Sciences.

Militant career 
In 1999, Abbatay left for Afghanistan, where he trained at the Al Farouq training camp. He was pulled from training by Khalid Sheikh Mohammed, and was later reassigned to work at al-Qaeda’s Media Committee. According to the FBI, al-Maghrebi fled to Iran soon after the events of the 9/11 terrorist attacks. 

In 2012, he started serving as al-Qaeda’s general manager in Afghanistan and Pakistan and ran As-Sahab, al-Qaeda’s media branch.

Designations 
On January 12, 2021, the U.S. Department of State designated Abbatay as a Specially Designated Global Terrorist, the U.S. Treasury’s Office of Foreign Assets Control added him to the Specially Designated Nationals and Blocked Persons List. The Department of State's Rewards for Justice Program is offering a reward of up to $7 million for information on Abbatay. On April 7, 2022, he was designated as a  terrorist entity by the Moroccan Ministry of Justice, who claimed that he was living in Iran.

At the time of al-Zawahiri's death in August 2022, Abbatay, along with Saif al-Adel, were reported to be in Iran. Abbatay and Adel's are seen as potential successors to Ayman al-Zawahiri as leader of al-Qaeda after his death.

References 

1970s births
Living people
Year of birth uncertain
Salafi jihadists
Moroccan al-Qaeda members
Al-Qaeda leaders